In 1981, China began minting coins to commemorate the Chinese New Year. The Chinese lunar series consist of gold, silver, and platinum coins in a variety of sizes, denominations, and shapes. The reverse of each coin depicts the zodiac animal for the corresponding year of issue, while the obverse features an historical building or other notable cultural image.

1981–1992 (1st Lunar Series) 

The size, mintage, metal content, and even face value changed throughout the first series. This is a reflection of China's gradual adoption of the ounce over the metric gram in line with international bullion standards and China's improving economic conditions and technological advances.

From 1981 to 1987 the obverse and reverse of the 8 g gold coin were the same as that of the 15 g silver coin. The exception being in 1985 when the reverse differed. 1987 seems to be special: (1) both the 5 oz. silver lunar coin and the 5 oz. silver panda coin were debuted, (2) the 5 oz. silver lunar coin was the first of the series to be over 99% pure silver, and (3) the 5 oz. silver coin had a face value of 50 yuan even though it contained over 10 times as much silver as the 15 g silver coin which had a face value of 10 yuan.

In 1988 the first platinum lunar coin was introduced and the number of different lunar coins exploded when the Shanghai Mint began minting a different set of lunar coins. In total there were 4 different designs: the 5oz coins featured triple dragons and the 15 g and 8 g coins each featured a different dragon; the Shanghai Mint coins featured double dragon reverses.

All coins minted by the Shenyang mint unless noted with an "SH" which indicates that it was minted by the Shanghai mint. The size, mintage, and face values are listed to illustrate the numerous changing standards in the first lunar series.

The 2nd Series 1988–1999 1 oz Silver Piedfort 

These were minted as 1oz silver but were 32mm in diameter instead of standard 40mm. This increased the thickness in the style of a piedfort coin.

 1988 Dragon Mintage: 20000
 1989 Snake
 1990 Horse
 1991 Goat
 1992 Monkey
 1993 Rooster Mintage: 9000
 1994 Dog
 1995 Pig
 1996 Rat
 1997 Ox Mintage: 8000
 1998 Tiger Mintage: 8000
 1999 Rabbit

The 3rd Series 1997–2008 1 oz Silver 

 1997 Ox
 1998 Tiger
 1999 Rabbit
 2000 Dragon
 2001 Snake
 2002 Horse
 2003 Goat
 2004 Monkey
 2005 Rooster
 2006 Dog
 2007 Pig
 2008 Rat

The 4th Series 2009–2020 1 oz Silver 

 2009 Ox
 2010 Tiger
 2011 Rabbit
 2012 Dragon
 2013 Snake
 2014 Horse
 2015 Goat
 2016 Monkey
 2017  Rooster

The 1st Scallop Series 1993–2004 ⅔ oz Silver 
Mintage: 6800 each

 1993 Rooster
 1994 Dog
 1995 Pig
 1996 Rat
 1997 Ox
 1998 Tiger
 1999 Rabbit
 2000 Dragon
 2001 Snake
 2002 Horse
 2003 Goat
 2004 Monkey

The 1st Scallop Series 1993–2004 ½ oz Gold 
Mintage: 2300 each

 1993 Rooster
 1994 Dog
 1995 Pig
 1996 Rat
 1997 Ox
 1998 Tiger
 1999 Rabbit
 2000 Dragon
 2001 Snake
 2002 Horse
 2003 Goat
 2004 Monkey

The 2nd Scallop Series 2005–2016 1 oz Silver 
Mintage: 60000 each

 2005 Rooster
 2006 Dog
 2007 Pig
 2008 Rat
 2009 Ox
 2010 Tiger
 2011 Rabbit
 2012 Dragon
 2013 Snake
 2014 Horse
 2015 Goat
 2016 Monkey

The 2nd Scallop Series 2005–2016 ½ oz Gold 
Mintage: 8000 each

 2005 Rooster
 2006 Dog
 2007 Pig
 2008 Rat
 2009 Ox
 2010 Tiger
 2011 Rabbit
 2012 Dragon
 2013 Snake
 2014 Horse
 2015 Goat
 2016 Monkey

The 1st Fan Series 2000–2011 1 oz Silver 
Mintage: 66000 each

 2000 Dragon
 2001 Snake
 2002 Horse
 2003 Goat
 2004 Monkey
 2005 Rooster
 2006 Dog
 2007 Pig
 2008 Rat
 2009 Ox
 2010 Tiger
 2011 Rabbit

The 1st Fan Series 2000–2011 ½ oz Gold 
Mintage: 6600 each

 2000 Dragon
 2001 Snake
 2002 Horse
 2003 Goat
 2004 Monkey
 2005 Rooster
 2006 Dog
 2007 Pig
 2008 Rat
 2009 Ox
 2010 Tiger
 2011 Rabbit

The 2nd Fan Series 2012–2024 ⅓ oz Gold 

 2012 Dragon
 2013 Snake
 2014 Horse
 2015 Goat

The 2nd Fan Series 2012–2024 1 oz Silver 

 2012 Dragon
 2013 Snake
 2014 Horse
 2015 Goat

 

Commemorative coins
Coins of China
Bullion coins